Federica Stufi (born 22 March 1988 in Firenze) is an Italian volleyball player. She plays for the Italy women's national volleyball team.

Career 
She participated in the 2017 FIVB Volleyball World Grand Prix.

Clubs

References

External links 

 
 
 Federica Stufi at LegaVolleyFemminile.it
 
 
 
 Frederica Stufi at GettyImages

1988 births
Living people
Italian women's volleyball players
Serie A1 (women's volleyball) players
Universiade gold medalists for Italy
Universiade medalists in volleyball
Medalists at the 2009 Summer Universiade